Tamil Murasu is a daily evening Tamil language newspaper published from nine cities of Tamil Nadu and Puducherry in India. It is owned by Kalanidhi Maran's Sun TV Network.

External links
 Tamil Murasu homepage (archived)'''

Mass media in Chennai
Tamil-language newspapers published in India
Mass media in Madurai
Mass media in Coimbatore
Sun Group
2004 establishments in India
Publications established in 2004